Srinivasa (Sanskrit ) is a Hindu name. The term Srinivasa is Vaishnava in origin, the combination of two Sanskrit words, Shri (श्री) and nivasa (निवास). 

It is a name for males in India as well as a family surname. Shrinivasan (श्रीनिवासन्) is the singular nominative form, and along with its variants Srinivasan, Srinivas, and others, is used as a forename or surname.

Etymology
Shri means "radiance" or "diffusing light"; nivasa means "place of residence", which is considered to be the source of light (as a metaphor for life) in Hindu scriptures.

Shri is also an epithet of Lakshmi who is the consort associated with Venkateshvara, and often described to be embodied within him. Hence, the alternative meaning of this name is: "one within whom Lakshmi (prosperity) lives".

Variants
Srinivas is the northern Indian variant of the original Sanskrit name Srinivasa, employed after the schwa-deletion in the Indo-Aryan languages.

The use of the name Srinivasan (also rendered Sreenivasan) is common in Tamil Nadu and Kerala. Similarly, the dialectical word, Srinivasulu, is commonly used in Andhra Pradesh and Telangana. The name is also very much prevalent in Odisha, Maharastra and Karnataka, among other parts of India.

The other variants in English spelling include Sreenivas, Shrinivas, Shreenivas, Srinibas, Shrinibas.

Notable people

As first name
 Srinivasa Ramanujan, Indian mathematician
 Srinivas, 1990s Tamil Nadu playback singer, also known as Srinivasan Doraiswamy
 Srinivasan, also known as "Powerstar", Tamil comedian 
 Sreenivasan, Malayalam script writer and actor
 Srinivas Avasarala, actor 
 Srinivasan Keshav, scientist
 Srinivas Kumar Sinha, Indian soldier
 Srinivasaraghavan Venkataraghavan, Indian cricketer
 SRINIVASA REDDY , DOCTOR

As middle name
 Ullal Srinivas Mallya, Indian politician
 Vaman Srinivas Kudva, Indian businessman

As last name
 Adithya Srinivasan, Ghazal singer and global business development leader
 Akhila Srinivasan, Indian businesswoman
 Dharmapuri Srinivas (born 27 September 1948), Indian politician
 G. Srinivasan (1958–2007), Indian film producer
 Grandhi Srinivas, Indian politician
 Hari Sreenivasan (b. 1974), Indian-American TV journalist
 Kamineni Srinivas, Indian politician
 Krishnan Srinivasan, Indian diplomat
 M. B. Sreenivasan (Manamadurai Balakrishnan known as MBS, 1925–1988), Indian music director
 M. N. Srinivas (Mysore Narasimhachar, 1916–1999), Indian sociologist
 Madapuji Rajagopalan Srinivasan (born 31 May 1967), usually cited as M.R. Srinivasan, head of Agricultural Entomology at the Agricultural College and Research Institute of Tamil Nadu Agricultural University. He has published works on both Apis cerana and Apis mellifera (western honey bee).
Madapusi Srinivasaprasad, Indian cricketer
 Mandyam Veerambudi Srinivasan ("Srini"), usually cited as M.V. Srinivasan (born 15 September 1948), bioengineer and neuroscientist, who studies visual systems, particularly those of Western honey bees (Apis mellifera) and birds; faculty member Queensland Brain Institute at the University of Queensland.
 N. Srinivasan (Narayanaswami, born 1945),  Indian industrialist and chemical engineer
 P. Seenivasan, Indian politician, Deputy Speaker of the Tamil Nadu Legislative Assembly from 1971 to 1972
 P. B. Sreenivas (Prathivadi Bhayankara, 1930–2013), Indian playback singer
 R. Srinivasan, Indian politician, member of the Tamil Nadu Legislative Assembly
 Rangaswamy Srinivasan, scientist
 Rettamalai Srinivasan, Indian politician
 Sri Srinivasan, American judge
 Subramaniam Srinivasan, Indian filmmaker
 T. E. Srinivasan (Tirumalai Echambadi, 1950–2010), Indian cricketer
 T. N. Srinivasan (Thirukodikaval Nilakanta, 1933–2018), economist who worked in the US
 Thengai Srinivasan (1937–1987), Indian actor
 U. Srinivas (Uppalapu, 1969–2014), Indian mandolin player
 Vandemataram Srinivas, Indian music director, playback singer, actor and film director 
 Vineeth Sreenivasan (born 1 October 1985), Indian playback singer, actor, film director, screenwriter, producer, lyricist, etc., working in Malayalam cinema, son of actor-screenwriter Sreenivasan. 
 Yogi Srinivasan, Indian actor, son of Thengai Srinivasan

See also
Venkateswara, Hindu deity
Srinivasa Rao, disambiguation page

References

Indian masculine given names